Michael Moon may refer to:
Michael Moon (professor), American academic
Michael Moon (EastEnders), fictional character
Michael Moon (band), a New York–based alternative rock group
Michael Jay Moon, co-founder and CEO of GISTICS Inc.
Michael J. Moon, technician and candidate in the United States House of Representatives elections in Michigan, 2010

See also
Mike Moon (disambiguation)

Moon, Michael